Secret Dubai was one of the most popular independent blogs in Dubai, United Arab Emirates in the 8 years of its operation, from 2002 until 2010. Launched in 2002 and written by an unidentified expatriate, "Secret Dubai" generated a significant following in the Middle East Blogosphere until the UAE's Telecoms Regulatory Authority (TRA) in the UAE blocked the website. In 2007, it won a Bloggie award for Africa and the Middle East. The blog's last entry date is April 2014.

References

 7DAYS Report

External links 
   Official Website

Emirati news websites
Internet censorship in the United Arab Emirates
2002 establishments in the United Arab Emirates